Leandro Esteban Guzmán (born 19 April 1989) is an Argentine professional footballer who plays as a midfielder for Almirante Brown.

Career
In 2008, Guzmán began playing at senior level with Atlanta in Primera B Metropolitana; having played for Huracán Las Breñas's youth. He scored his first goal versus Flandria in April 2009. His third season, 2010–11, concluded with promotion to Primera B Nacional as champions. Guzmán's second tier bow arrived on 21 August 2011 versus Atlético Tucumán. The club suffered instant relegation back to Primera B Metropolitana, as the midfielder appeared twenty-five times. Five goals along with one hundred and five matches followed as he remained for four seasons. In January 2016, Guzmán signed for Guillermo Brown of Primera B Nacional.

Guzmán joined third tier team Deportivo Morón in July 2016. He scored four goals, three of which were in games with Acassuso, in his opening campaign which ended with promotion to Primera B Nacional. After eighteen games in the succeeding campaign, Guzmán completed a move to Almirante Brown on 18 July 2018.

Career statistics
.

Honours
Atlanta
Primera B Metropolitana: 2010–11

Deportivo Morón
Primera B Metropolitana: 2016–17

References

External links

1989 births
Living people
People from Resistencia, Chaco
Argentine footballers
Association football midfielders
Primera B Metropolitana players
Primera Nacional players
Club Atlético Atlanta footballers
Guillermo Brown footballers
Deportivo Morón footballers
Club Almirante Brown footballers
Sportspeople from Chaco Province